Sonderhof is a locality in the municipality Schmallenberg in the district Hochsauerlandkreis in North Rhine-Westphalia, Germany.

The hamlet has 8 inhabitants and lies in the north of the municipality of Schmallenberg at a height of around 590 m. Sonderhof borders on the villages of Osterwald and Rimberg.

References

Villages in North Rhine-Westphalia
Schmallenberg